Esplendor is a Brazilian telenovela produced and broadcast by Rede Globo. It premiered on 31 January 2000, replacing Força de um Desejo, and ended on 24 June 2000, replaced by O Cravo e a Rosa. The telenovela is written by Ana Maria Moretzsohn, with the collaboration of Glória Barreto, Daisy Chaves, and Izabel de Oliveira.

It stars Letícia Spiller, Floriano Peixoto, Murilo Benício, Caio Blat, Christine Fernandes, Cássia Kis, Gracindo Júnior, and Joana Fomm.

Cast 
 Letícia Spiller as Flávia Cristina Sampaio
 Floriano Peixoto as Frederico Berger
 Murilo Benício as Cristóvão Rocha
 Cássia Kis as Adelaide Berger
 Joana Fomm as Olga Faria Norman
 Gracindo Júnior as Hugo Norman
 Caio Blat as Bruno Sampaio
 Christine Fernandes as Flávia Regina Pereira
 Caco Ciocler as Lázaro Povoa
 Tônia Carrero as Mimi Melody
 Ítalo Rossi as Vicente Almeida
 Ângela Figueiredo as Elisa Berguer
 Zezé Motta as Irene da Silva
 Osmar Prado as Rodolfo Bernardes
 Cláudia Alencar as Laura Bernardes
 Thiago de Los Reyes as Guilherme "Gui" Berger
 Max Fercondini as Frederico "Freddy" Berger Junior
 Juliana Knust as Helena Bernardes
 Adriana Garambone as Marisa Faria Norman
 Marcos Palmeira as Francisco Hodges
 Lucinha Lins as Lígia Mallet
 Guilherme Piva as Marcelo Neves
 Luiz Guilherme as Augusto Silveira
 Guga Coelho as Luciano "Caçula"
 Marcelo Saback as Mariano Rodrigues
 Karine Carvalho as Suzy Mallet
 Anselmo Vasconcelos as Antônio Rajão
 Thaís Fersoza as Érica Berger
 Henri Castelli as Dino Ferreira
 Edward Boggis as Otávio Guerreiro
 Ângela Rebello as Gertrudes Santos
 Chico Tenreiro as Ivo Martins
 Bijú Martins as Sandro da Silva
 Daniele Guerreiro as Nina Rodrigues
 Elísio Lage as Cássio Arantes 
 Luiz Cláudio Júnior as Pablo Bernardes

Guest stars 
 Marcelo Serrado as David Martins 
 Flávio Galvão as Arnaldo Ferreira
 Rosaly Papadopol as Mariota

References

External links 
 

2000 telenovelas
2000s Brazilian television series
2000 Brazilian television series debuts
2000 Brazilian television series endings
TV Globo telenovelas
Brazilian telenovelas
Portuguese-language telenovelas